Old Monk Rum is an iconic vatted Indian dark rum, launched in 1954. It is a dark rum with a distinct vanilla flavour, with an alcohol content of 42.8%. It is produced in Ghaziabad, Uttar Pradesh and have registered office in Solan, Himachal Pradesh. 

There is no advertising, its popularity depends on word of mouth and loyalty of customers. However, in 2013 Old Monk lost its rank as the largest selling dark rum to McDowell's No.1 Celebration Rum. Old Monk has been the biggest Indian Made Foreign Liquor (IMFL) brand for many years.

Old Monk was ranked 5th among Indian spirits brands at the Impact International's 2008 list of "Top 100 Brands At Retail Value" with a retail value of US$240 million.

It is sold in six size variants: 90 ml, 180 ml, 375 ml, 500ml,  750 ml, and 1 litre bottles. 
Old Monk had been awarded gold medals at Monde Selections since 1982.

History

In 1855, an entrepreneurial Scotsman named Edward Abraham Dyer, father of Colonel Reginald Dyer set up a brewery in Kasauli, Himachal Pradesh to cater to the British requirement for cheap beer. This brewery changed hands and became a distillery by the name of Mohan Meakin Pvt. Ltd.

Old Monk, reportedly a creation of Ved Rattan Mohan, former managing director of Mohan Meakin, was first introduced in India in the 1960s. Colonel Ved Mohan, brother of Kapil Mohan, had been inspired by the serene life of Benedictine monks and the drinks they brewed as they led their ascetic life in the mountains where they lived in content. And hence, the drink got its name. Before Old Monk, there was Hercules rum (still sold) that was distilled exclusively for the armed forces. Superior in taste and perhaps even in quality to Hercules (as loyalists believe), the brand soon became one of the leading dark rums in the world and perhaps the most popular IMFL (Indian-Made Foreign Liquor) brand in the country. The affordable pricing strategy has also worked in their favor. 

There was a time when Old Monk dominated the rum market. There were other brands also but none came close in quality or popularity. About eight million bottles were sold annually. As of 2015, the sales are a quarter of that and they continue to decline. There were recent rumours about Old Monk closing down but its makers, Mohan Meakin Ltd, assured that Old Monk is not going to be taken off market.

Varieties

While the 7 years aged XXX rum grade is the most popular, there are Supreme & Gold Reserve varieties which are gaining in popularity. These are aged for 12 years and are blended with highly matured spirits. Supreme also comes in a special bottle, with the shape of a standing monk. The top part of the monk's head is the bottle cap, which also doubles up as a peg measure. There is a limited edition that was launched in 2013. The number of years it has been aged is unclear, the box states "very old vatted". The 1 litre bottle is in the shape of the old monk's face.

 Old Monk Supreme Rum
 Old Monk Gold Reserve Rum
 Old Monk XXX Rum
 Old Monk Deluxe XXX Rum
 Old Monk White Rum
 Old Monk Legend - Limited Edition - The recently launched Old Monk Legend, which are aged slightly longer, is priced at Rs1200 a bottle in Maharashtra -- the highest for any domestic rum. In its first month itself, it got the numbers that were expected in three years.
 Old Monk - The Connoisseur Collection - Includes Old Monk Orange Rum, Old Monk Lemon Rum, Old Monk Apple Rum, Old Monk White Rum, Old Monk Cola, Old Monk Cranberry and Old Monk Mojito.

International
Old Monk is sold by some retailers in Russia, United States, UK, Germany, Japan, UAE, Estonia, Finland, Qatar, New Zealand, Canada, Kenya, Uganda, Zambia, Cameroon, Australia, Singapore, Bahrain and Malaysia, Cyprus.

References

External links
OldMonk official website

Alcoholic drink brands
Indian distilled drinks
Indian brands
Rums